The 1976 Villanova Wildcats football team represented the Villanova University during the 1976 NCAA Division I football season. Head coach Dick Bedesem, coaching his second season with the Wildcats, installed a "wishbone" offense featuring fullback Vince Thompson (Soph.). After an adjustment period, the offense clicked and Villanova won its final five games, upsetting 13th ranked Boston College. The team played their home games at Villanova Stadium in Villanova, Pennsylvania.

Schedule

References

Villanova
Villanova Wildcats football seasons
Villanova Wildcats football